Charles Rogers (born July 5, 1987) is an American film director, screenwriter, producer and actor best known for his movie Fort Tilden and the TV series Search Party.

Career
Rogers is a graduate of the New York University Tisch School of the Arts MFA film directing program. He was one of the filmmakers behind the multi-director feature film Black Dog, Red Dog, produced by James Franco and Rabbit Bandini Productions, starring Logan Marshall-Green, Chloe Sevigny, and Whoopi Goldberg, which premiered at the 2015 International Film Festival of Guanajuato. The film was a class project at the NYU graduate film program, taught by Franco, wherein ten students adapted the poetry of Stephen Dobyns.

In 2014 he co-wrote and co-directed Fort Tilden in collaboration with Sarah-Violet Bliss. Starring Bridey Elliott and Clare McNulty, the film premiered at SXSW, where it won the Grand Jury Award and was subsequently acquired by Orion Pictures. Fort Tilden centers on two inept best friends on a disastrous journey to the beach. It was released on August 14, 2015 theatrically and through video on demand. The film received generally positive reviews from major critics.

Search Party
Rogers and Violet-Bliss reunited in 2016 for the comedy/mystery TBS television series Search Party, which they co-created along with Michael Showalter. The show stars Alia Shawkat, John Early, John Reynolds, Meredith Hagner and Brandon Micheal Hall as a group of New York hipsters who find themselves involved in a series of mysteries. Search Party received critical acclaim, holding a 100% approval rating on review aggregator website Rotten Tomatoes, based on 20 reviews, with an average rating of 8.1/10. On Metacritic, the first season holds a rating of 81 out of 100, based on 18 critics, indicating "universal acclaim". The second season premiered on TBS on November 19, 2017 and received positive reviews from television critics. It holds a 95% approval rating on Rotten Tomatoes and was called a "biting satire made for the Trump era" by Vanity Fair. Both Violet-Bliss and Rogers have since signed an overall deal with HBO Max.

Other film and TV work

Along with Jordan Firstman, he co-wrote and co-starred in the short film Men Don't Whisper, which was an official selection at the 2018 Sundance Film Festival as well as the 2018 South by Southwest Film Festival.  The film follows a gay couple with masculinity issues who attempt to sleep with women. Produced by JASH, it also stars Fort Tilden and Search Party actors Bridey Elliott and Clare McNulty, and features a guest appearance by Saturday Night Live alum Cheri Oteri.

In addition to his work on Search Party, Rogers has worked as a writer on the first and second seasons of the Netflix series Wet Hot American Summer, as well as for the second season of the Amazon series Mozart in the Jungle which won the Golden Globe Award for Best Television Series – Musical or Comedy.

Other work
Rogers, along with comedian and multimedia artist Casey Jane Ellison, co-hosted the Earwolf produced limited series podcast The Problem with Charles and Casey which premiered on March 31, 2019. The podcast featured in-depth interviews with guests, including Louie Anderson, Jessica Williams, Starlee Kine,  Jordan Firstman, and Chelsea Peretti, about a problem they are facing in their lives. Rogers has appeared twice as a guest on The George Lucas Talk Show, first during the May the AR Be LI$$ You Arli$$ marathon fundraiser, and later on The George Lucas Holiday Special.

Recognition
Rogers was named one of the 2017 Forbes 30 Under 30 in the Hollywood and Entertainment section, and was listed in Out Magazine's OUT100 as one of the 100 most compelling LGBT people in 2017.  In 2017, The Hollywood Reporter named Rogers and Bliss "Hollywood Power Showrunners: Ones To Watch" in their annual list of the top 50 television showrunners and in 2016, the creative duo were named Variety's 10 Writers to Watch.

References

External links

Living people
1987 births
American male screenwriters
American male actors
American producers
LGBT film directors
American LGBT screenwriters
American gay writers
Place of birth missing (living people)
Film directors from Texas
Tisch School of the Arts alumni
St. Edward's University alumni